Ballia Nagar is a constituency of the Uttar Pradesh Legislative Assembly covering the city of Ballia Nagar in the Ballia district of Uttar Pradesh, India. It is one of five assembly constituencies in the Ballia Lok Sabha constituency. Since 2008, this assembly constituency is numbered 361 amongst 403 constituencies.

Members of Legislative Assembly

Election results

2022

2017
Bharatiya Janta Party member Anand Swaroop Shukla was the MLA, who won in the 2017 Uttar Pradesh Legislative Elections, defeating Samajwadi Party candidate Laxman by a margin of 40,011 votes.

References

External links
 

Assembly constituencies of Uttar Pradesh
Ballia